The 180th (2/5th London) Brigade was a formation of the British Army during the First World War. It was assigned to the 60th (2/2nd London) Division and served in the Middle East.

Formation
All battalions of the London Regiment as follows:
2/17th (County of London) Battalion (Poplar and Stepney Rifles)
2/18th (County of London) Battalion (London Irish Rifles)
2/19th (County of London) Battalion (St Pancras)
2/20th (County of London) Battalion (Blackheath and Woolwich)
180th Machine Gun Company 
180th Trench Mortar Battery
In June 1918 three battalions (2/17th, 2/18th and 2/20th) were replaced by
2nd Battalion, 30th Punjabis
1st Battalion, 50th Kumaon Rifles
2nd Battalion, Guides Infantry

Commanders

References

Infantry brigades of the British Army in World War I
Military units and formations in London